Fortunato v. Office of Stephen M. Silston, D.D.S., 856 A.2d 530 (Conn. Super. 2004) is a United States employment law case, concerning wrongful termination.

Facts
An employee filed a wrongful discharge suit, claiming that her employer, a dentist, terminated her after he learned that her daughter was thinking about filing a medical malpractice action against him.

She alleged that her termination fell under the public-policy exception to the at-will employment doctrine, in that it violated public policy underlying her right to free association, her daughter's right to open access to the courts, and the Connecticut Unfair Trade Practices Act (CUTPA), Conn. Gen. Stat. § 42-110b(a).

Judgment
The court noted that "This employment termination matter raises an issue apparently new to Connecticut. It is alleged that an individual's exercise of a protected right has led to an employer's retaliatory termination of an employee in violation of public policy."

The court held that (1) the employer's conduct did not violate the employee's right to freely associate with her daughter; (2) employer-employee relationships did not fall within the definition of "trade" or "commerce" for the purposes of an action under the CUTPA; but (3) discharging an employee because a close relative was contemplating legal action against the employee's employer affected the relative's right of access to the courts and violated the public policy that Conn. Const. art. I, § 10 promoted, and the employee stated a valid claim for recovery under that theory.

See also
US labor law

Notes

References
Rothstein and Liebman, Employment Law: Cases and Materials (6th edn Foundation Press)

United States labor case law
Connecticut state case law
2004 in United States case law
2004 in Connecticut
Dentistry in the United States
Medical malpractice